William VII (born Peter, Pierre-Guillaume) (1023 – autumn 1058), called the Eagle (Aigret) or the Bold (le Hardi), was the duke of Aquitaine and count of Poitou (as William V) between 1039 and his death, following his half-brother Odo.

William was the third son of William V of Aquitaine, the eldest by his third wife, Agnes of Burgundy. He was brother-in-law of the Holy Roman Emperor Henry III, who married his sister Agnes. His mother remarried to Geoffrey Martel, Count of Anjou, during his reign. William won his patrimony in a war with his half-brother Odo, who was killed in battle at Mauzé. He did not, however, succeed in occupying Gascony.

Geoffrey Martel refused to concede to him the territories gained in the reigns of his predecessors. William set to work regaining his patrimony by force of arms. He was besieging Geoffrey in Saumur when he died of dysentery.

He was married to Ermesinde, of unknown origins. Two daughters have been hypothesized to be children of this couple: 
Clementia, who married Conrad I of Luxembourg
Agnes, who married Peter I of Savoy.

References

Sources

See also 
Dukes of Aquitaine family tree

House of Poitiers
Counts of Poitiers
William 07 of Aquitaine
1023 births
1058 deaths